David Stephenson Rohde (born August 7, 1967) is an American author and investigative journalist who currently serves as the online news director for The New Yorker. While a reporter for The Christian Science Monitor, he won the Pulitzer Prize for International Reporting in 1996 for his coverage of the Srebrenica massacre. From 2002 until 2005, he was co-chief of The New York Times South Asia bureau, based in New Delhi, India. He  later contributed to the newspaper's team coverage of Afghanistan and Pakistan that received the 2009 Pulitzer Prize for International Reporting and was a finalist in his own right in the category in 2010. He is also a global affairs analyst for CNN.

While in Afghanistan, Rohde was kidnapped by members of the Taliban in November 2008, but managed to escape in June 2009 after seven months in captivity. While he was in captivity, The New York Times collaborated with a number of media outlets, including al-Jazeera and Wikipedia, to remove news of the kidnapping from the public eye. This was done so to not increase his value as a hostage and bargaining chip, and so increase his chances of eventual survival.

Background
Rohde is a native of Maine. He is a graduate of Fryeburg Academy, a boarding school located in Fryeburg, Maine. He attended Bates College before transferring to Brown University, where he received a B.A. in history in 1990. He is married to Kristen Mulvihill, a picture editor for Cosmopolitan magazine.

Reporting
Rohde worked as a production secretary for the ABC News World News Tonight program from June 1990 to August 1991 and as a production associate for ABC's New Turning Point from January to July 1993. He has also worked as a freelance reporter based in the Baltic republics, Cuba, and Syria. He served as a county and municipal reporter for The Philadelphia Inquirer from July 1993 to June 1994 before joining The Christian Science Monitor. He initially covered national news, reporting from Boston, New York City, and Washington, D.C. In November 1994, he was sent to Zagreb, Croatia, to work as the newspaper's Eastern European correspondent, in which role he helped to expose the ethnic cleansing and genocide of the Muslim population of eastern Bosnia. He joined The New York Times in April 1996 and worked for them through mid-2011. He reported from Afghanistan for the first three months of the US-led war against the Taliban and served as co-chief of the Timess South Asia bureau from 2002 to 2005. From 2005 to 2011, he was a member of the Timess investigations department in New York City. Before joining The New Yorker in May 2017, he worked for Reuters in a variety of capacities, including foreign affairs columnist (2011-2013), investigative reporter (2014-2015) and national security investigations editor (2015-2017).

He was described by his Times colleagues as "an intrepid yet unassuming reporter who conducts himself modestly around the office, predictably attired in neatly ironed Oxford shirts and, often, his weathered Boston Red Sox cap."

Srebrenica
Rohde was the first outside eyewitness of the aftermath of the Srebrenica massacre when he traveled to the eastern Bosnian town of Srebrenica and Zepa in August 1995, a month after the fall of the towns to the Army of the Republika Srpska. He reported seeing human bones, "Muslim prayer beads, clothing and still legible receipts and election ballots from Srebrenica", as well as shell casings and ammunition boxes in the vicinity of three large mass graves. He described being told that Bosnian Serb troops were hunting down and summarily executing Bosnian Muslims (Bosniaks) from the town. He subsequently located eyewitnesses to the massacre and wrote about the circumstances that led up to the killings.

He returned to the Republika Srpska in October 1995 to follow up his article on the Srebrenica massacre, but was secretly arrested by Bosnian Serb authorities on October 29 in the town of Zvornik, around 80 miles from Sarajevo. He was charged with "illegal border crossing and staying on the territory of the Republika Srpska and for falsifying documents". He was held captive in the Bosnian Serb-held town of Bijeljina for ten days, during which he was repeatedly interrogated, harassed and kept in a 10-foot-by-20-foot (3m by 7m) cell with five other inmates for over 23 hours a day. Rohde was sentenced to 15 days' imprisonment on the first two charges and was due to be sentenced on the spying charge before he was released. The trial had been held in Serbo-Croatian and, although a translator was present, there was no defense lawyer and no US diplomatic representation as required by the Vienna Convention. The espionage charge, the most serious of the three, was "punishable by three to 15 years (imprisonment) in peacetime and 10 years to death in wartime."

Rohde's capture was not initially admitted by the Bosnian Serb authorities, who gave conflicting answers as to whether he had been detained and where he was being held. Five days after he was taken prisoner, the Bosnian Serb news agency issued a statement on his capture. The US Government subsequently brought to bear intense diplomatic pressure to release him. A key role was played by Kati Marton, an author and journalist married to the US envoy Richard Holbrooke, who was negotiating with the Serbian president Slobodan Milošević to end the Bosnian War. Marton, who was at the time the chairwoman of the Committee to Protect Journalists, intervened repeatedly during the talks that led to the Dayton Agreement to persuade Milošević to use his influence to secure Rohde's release. The US Secretary of State Warren Christopher was also involved in pressing for Rohde's release at the Dayton talks. A variety of other political and journalistic figures were also involved in campaigning on Rohde's behalf, including Senator Bob Dole, Peter Jennings, Ted Koppel, Samantha Power, and David Frost. Rohde was subsequently pardoned by order of the Bosnian Serb leader, Radovan Karadžić in what Karadžić characterized as a goodwill gesture.

Following his release, Rohde reported that he had reached Srebrenica and found substantial evidence of the massacre at four of six of the mass grave sites previously identified by US reconnaissance aircraft and satellites and commented: "A final, accurate accounting of the Srebrenica massacres will only come if Sahanici and the other five sites are dredged for the truth." He described the circumstances of his arrest: "This correspondent changed the date of issue on a Bosnian Serb press accreditation from 19/12/94 to 29/10/95 and used it to pass through Bosnian Serb checkpoints and reach the area. This correspondent was arrested at the execution site by Bosnian Serb police, stripped of all documents and photos taken of the area, accused of espionage, and jailed for 10 days." His ordeal in captivity and the subsequent negotiations to free him were described in detail in a three-part special report published a few days later.

Rohde's reporting from Bosnia, according to the British journalist Henry Porter, "had a deep effect on the journalists who had covered the Bosnian civil war. They became not so much militarised as passionately committed to fighting Milosevic's regime ... if Rohde had not – at some personal risk – set out to prove the rumours about the massacres, a great truth would have been buried along with the thousands of men from Srebrenica." Porter observed that "the extent of the slaughter might not have emerged if it had not been for the bravery of David Rohde."

Rohde went on to testify before the US House of Representatives Committee on Security and Cooperation in Europe in December 1995 on what he had seen at Srebrenica. He returned to Srebrenica with a group of Western reporters at the start of April 1996, reporting that "approximately 70 percent of the larger of the two mass graves and approximately 50 percent of the smaller of the two have been recently dug up" and that other evidence that he had seen the previous October had been removed.

Also in April 1996, Rohde won the Polk Award for foreign reporting, being cited for "risking his life to uncover the Srebrenica massacres of Bosnian Muslims, the worst genocide in Europe since the Holocaust." Shortly afterwards, Rohde was awarded the 1996 Pulitzer Prize "for his persistent on-site reporting of the massacre of thousands of Bosnian Muslims in Srebrenica.

In 1997, Rohde published a widely acclaimed account of the massacre, Endgame: The Betrayal and Fall of Srebrenica, Europe's Worst Massacre Since World War II (published in paperback as A Safe Area: Srebrenica – Europe's Worst Massacre Since the Second World War). It was described as a "masterly" account of how "good – but conflicted and weakly held – Western intentions were swept away by the racist imperatives of the Serb leaders." Writing in The Guardian, Julian Borger declared it to be "essential reading" and commented: "It is journalism at its committed best – painstaking, compassionate, full of telling detail and rigorous in its judgments."

Rohde's work was the subject of study by a class in "Elements of International Reporting" at Columbia University's journalism school in spring 2001.  The study explained: "We felt that Rohde's work was ideal for a case study in reporting on gross human rights violations, presenting opportunities to study both the professional techniques and the moral issues that pertain to such work."

Detainees
While at The New York Times, Rohde has written about the wars in Afghanistan and Iraq. He has reported among other things on the hardships endured by men detained and released from the U.S. military detention center at Guantanamo Bay, Cuba. During 2004 and 2005 he wrote extensively on the treatment of detainees at the notorious Abu Ghraib prison in Baghdad and at the Bagram Air Base in Afghanistan. He also broke the story of the full extent of the US Government's roundup of American Muslims following the September 11, 2001 attacks. The American Prospect noted:

In April 2009, Rohde shared in a second Pulitzer Prize, awarded to the staff of The New York Times for "its masterful, groundbreaking coverage of America's deepening military and political challenges in Afghanistan and Pakistan, reporting frequently done under perilous conditions."

Kidnapping

In November 2008, while in Afghanistan doing research for a book, Rohde and two associates were kidnapped by members of the Taliban. After being held captive for seven months and ten days, in June 2009 Rohde and one of his associates escaped and made their way to safety. The other associate escaped a month later. During his captivity, Rohde's colleagues at The New York Times appealed to other members of the news media not to publish any stories relating to the abduction. The resulting media blackout of Rohde's kidnapping has caused a wider debate about the responsibility to report news in a timely manner. Wikipedia co-founder Jimmy Wales complied with a request from the Times to maintain the blackout, which he did through several administrators.

Recognition
In January 2012, Rohde was named one of the International Press Institute's World Press Freedom Heroes.

See also
List of solved missing person cases

Bibliography
 Endgame: The Betrayal and Fall of Srebrenica, Europe's Worst Massacre Since World War II (1997; Farrar, Straus and Giroux;  / 1998; Westview Press)
 A Safe Area: Srebrenica – Europe's Worst Massacre Since the Holocaust, 1997.
 David Rohde and Kristen Mulvihill, A Rope and a Prayer: A Kidnapping from Two Sides, 2010.

References

External links

Held by The Taliban: A Reporting Trip Becomes a Kidnapping – Interactive feature from The New York Times

1967 births
American investigative journalists
American people taken hostage
American war correspondents
Brown University alumni
The Christian Science Monitor people
Foreign hostages in Afghanistan
George Polk Award recipients
Living people
The New York Times writers
The Philadelphia Inquirer people
Pulitzer Prize for International Reporting winners
Place of birth missing (living people)
Fryeburg Academy alumni
Livingston Award winners for International Reporting
Writers from Maine
War correspondents of the War in Afghanistan (2001–2021)